Polacanthopoda is a genus of moths of the family Noctuidae. The genus was erected by George Hampson in 1901

Species
 Polacanthopoda anthina Jordan, 1926
 Polacanthopoda humphreyi Hampson, 1911
 Polacanthopoda naveli Le Cerf, 1922
 Polacanthopoda tigrina H. Druce, 1882

The Global Lepidoptera Names Index and Lepidoptera and Some Other Life Forms give this name as a synonym of Aegocera Latreille, 1809.

References

Agaristinae